In mathematics, an Eichler order, named after Martin Eichler,  is an order of a quaternion algebra that is the intersection of two maximal orders.

References

Number theory